Miguel Díaz' may refer to: Miguel Díaz Morlet.

People
Miguel Díaz (boxing) (born 1938), Argentine boxing trainer 
Miguel Chacón Díaz (1930–2011), Spanish professional racing cyclist
Miguel Díaz (Salvadoran footballer) (born 1957), Salvadorian football player
Miguel Díaz-Canel (born 1960), Cuban politician
Miguel "Angá" Díaz (1961–2006), Cuban percussionist
Miguel H. Díaz (born 1963), American theologian and diplomat
Miguel Díaz de la Portilla (born 1963), American lawyer and politician
Miguel Díaz (Spanish footballer) (born 1994), Spanish footballer
 Miguel Díaz (Chilean footballer), Chilean footballer
Miguel Díaz (baseball) (born 1994), Dominican Republic baseball player

Fiction
Miguel Diaz (character), a protagonist in television series Cobra Kai (part of The Karate Kid franchise)

See also
Miguel Dias (born 1968), Dutch boxer
Miguel Torres Díaz, Puerto Rican civil engineer